Chylak (Polish) or Khilyak (Belarusian or Ukrainian) is a surname. Notable people with the surname include:

Dorota Chylak (born 1966), Polish swimmer
Nestor Chylak (1922–1982), American umpire in Major League Baseball

Polish-language surnames